Xu Mo (born 2 March 1990) is a Chinese handball player. She plays on the Chinese national team and participated at the 2011 World Women's Handball Championship in Brazil.

References

1990 births
Living people
Chinese female handball players
Asian Games medalists in handball
Handball players at the 2010 Asian Games
Handball players at the 2014 Asian Games
Asian Games gold medalists for China
Medalists at the 2010 Asian Games